John Stewart (died 1769), of Castle Stewart, Wigtownshire, was a Scottish politician.

He was a Member (MP) for Wigtownshire in 1747–1754.

References

Year of birth missing
1769 deaths
18th-century Scottish people
People from Dumfries and Galloway
Members of the Parliament of Great Britain for Scottish constituencies
British MPs 1747–1754